Tomi Maanoja (born 12 September 1986) is a Finnish former professional goalkeeper. Maanoja has been capped twice for Finland.

Career

Maanoja made his first appearance in the Veikkausliiga with AC Allianssi from Vantaa in 2005. He completed a move to the neighbouring city's (Espoo) most notable football club, FC Honka, the following season. Maanoja was regarded as one of the best Finnish young goalkeepers and attracted interest from several foreign clubs before his move to AIK on 29 July 2008.

On 28 February 2009, Maanoja became seriously injured in a pre-season game against Assyriska Föreningen. He broke his leg in two places, rushing out to stop an Assyriska attack. The injury made him miss the 2009 UEFA European Under-21 Football Championship, hosted in Sweden, in the summer. He also missed the whole 2009 Allsvenskan season, when AIK won the double. He moved back to Honka in 2011, and on 21 February 2012 he signed a contract with the Norwegian First Division club Sandefjord Fotball as a free agent. Sandefjord's head coach Arne Sandstø let Maanoja play the match against Alta in May 2012 instead of Iven Austbø, but Maanoja spent the rest of the season as the reserve goalkeeper. After one season in Norway, he moved back to Finland and signed for RoPS.

During the season spent with RoPS, he was selected as the player of the month in Veikkausliiga (July) after showing impressive form and going through the whole month without conceding a goal.

2014 He moved to KuPS (Kuopion Palloseura) signing a two-year contract. During the 2014 season Maanoja made a new club record by keeping 13 clean sheets in the league while featuring in all of the competitive matches playing every minute during that season.

In 2020, he joined IF Gnistan.

Honours

AC Allianssi
 Finnish League Cup: 2004, 2005

AIK
 Allsvenskan: 2009
 Svenska Cupen: 2009
 Supercupen: 2010

FC Honka
 Finnish League Cup: 2011

RoPS
 Finnish Cup: 2013

References

External links

 

1987 births
Living people
Footballers from Espoo
Finnish footballers
Finland international footballers
Association football goalkeepers
FC Honka players
AIK Fotboll players
Sandefjord Fotball players
Rovaniemen Palloseura players
FC Lahti players
HIFK Fotboll players
IF Gnistan players
Veikkausliiga players
Allsvenskan players
Ykkönen players
Norwegian First Division players
Finnish expatriate footballers
Expatriate footballers in Sweden
Finnish expatriate sportspeople in Sweden
Expatriate footballers in Norway
Finnish expatriate sportspeople in Norway